Hong Kong singer G.E.M. has released six studio albums, five EPs, two live albums, one compilation album, and twenty-six singles.

Albums

Studio albums

EPs

Live albums

Compilation albums

Split albums

Singles

Other singles

Covers

Collaborations

Soundtracks

Commercial Singles

Compositions for Other Singers

References

Discographies of Hong Kong artists
Pop music discographies
Mandopop discographies